Jeroen Kampschreur (born 9 April 1999 in Leiderdorp) is a Dutch paralympic skier. Kampschreur was born without shinbones, which resulted in both of his legs being amputated above the knee at age one. Consequently, he began using a wheelchair. On 23 March 2018, Kampschreur was knighted in the Order of Orange-Nassau.

Education
Kampschreur was a student at the Beekdal Lyceum in Arnhem, Netherlands. He followed a HAVO education and passed his exams in 2018.

Career
Kampschreur practiced wheelchair basketball, and represented the Netherlands in U18 and U22 level competitions, at one point being the youngest player in the U22 team, but decided to focus on para-alpine skiing. He won three gold medals on the 2017 World Para Alpine Skiing Championships.  Kampschreur has also achieved several podium placements in the para-alpine skiing World Cup and Europa Cup spread over the events slalom, giant slalom and Super-G. He won five gold medals at the 2019 World Para Alpine Skiing Championships

Kampschreur trains at the National Sports Centre Papendal in Arnhem, Netherlands. He has sessions twice a day, five days a week.

2018 Winter Paralympics
Kampschreur participated in the 2018 Winter Paralympics where he won a gold medal in the men's super combined. This achievement made him the first Dutch athlete to win a medal in Para-Alpine Skiing at the Paralympics. He was chosen to be the flag bearer during the closing ceremony.

2022 Winter Paralympics
He represented the Netherlands at the 2022 Winter Paralympics in Beijing, China. He won the silver medal in the men's super combined sitting event.

Outside sport
Kampschreur has served as an ambassador for the Johan Cruyff Foundation in the Netherlands.

Awards and nominations
 Received the Zilveren Erespeld from the Municipal Government of Leiderdorp
 Was named Allianz Athlete of the Month for January 2017 by the International Paralympic Committee 
 Has been nominated for Paralympian of the Year 2017 by the NOC*NSF
 Was named Sportsman of the Year 2017 by Stichting Sportpromotie Leiderdorp

References

External links 

 

1999 births
Living people
People from Leiderdorp
Knights of the Order of Orange-Nassau
Dutch male alpine skiers
Paralympic alpine skiers of the Netherlands
Alpine skiers at the 2018 Winter Paralympics
Alpine skiers at the 2022 Winter Paralympics
Paralympic medalists in alpine skiing
Medalists at the 2018 Winter Paralympics
Medalists at the 2022 Winter Paralympics
Paralympic gold medalists for the Netherlands
Paralympic silver medalists for the Netherlands
Sportspeople from South Holland
21st-century Dutch people